The Ajloun Forest Reserve is a nature reserve located in the Ajloun Governorate in north-west Jordan. The reserve is houses a captive breeding programme for the locally extinct roe deer and has been declared an Important Bird Area by BirdLife International. There are also a number of hiking trails for tourists.

In October 2018, Ajloun Natural Reserve won a place among the top 100 sustainable destinations on the global tourism map.

Geography and climate
The climate in the reserve is rare in Jordan as wooded areas account for only 1% of Jordan's area. The geography of the reserve contains mostly rolling hills and valleys as well as some springs. The reserve enjoys a Mediterranean-like climate but has been affected by desertification and deforestation for the past 200 years.

Flora and fauna

The reserve is home to a wide variety of plants and animals. The following animals can be found at the reserve:
 Evergreen oak, (Quercus calliprinos)
 Carob, (Ceratonia siliqua)
 Terebinth (Pistacia terebinthus)
 Strawberry tree, (Arbutus andrachne)
 Black iris, (Iris nigricans), the national flower of Jordan
 Wild boar (Sus scrofa)
 Stone marten (Martes foina)
 Golden jackal (Canis aureus)
 Red fox (Vulpes vulpes)
 Striped hyena (Hyaena hyaena)
 Persian squirrel (Sciurus anomalus)
 Indian crested porcupine (Hystrix indica)
 Wolf (Canis lupus)
 Roe deer (Capreolus capreolus)

RSCN programs

The RSCN manages the reserves public and touristic programs. Tourists can stay in tented lodges or cabins between the months of March and November. The RSCN also leads an educational initiative for local youth to learn about biodiversity. Students are taught to measure soil quality, monitor tree renewal and classify plants and animals. The RSCN has also re-introduced the locally extinct roe deer from specimens taken from Turkey. Today there are approximately 12 deer living within the reserve as part of a captive breeding program.

References

External links

Environmentalists Fight Building Plans on Ajloun Reserve
 Royal Society for the Conservation of Nature (RSCN) Ajloun Forest Reserve Page
 Information on Tourism in the Ajloun Reserve

Ajloun Governorate
Tourism in Jordan